Güler İleri (born 1948) is a Turkish female pharmacist, politician and former government minister.

Güler İleri was born into a wealthy and well-established family of Çuhadaroğlu in Zile, Tokat Province, Turkey in 1948. She completed the primary and middle education in her hometown. After graduating from the College of Pharmacy in Ankara in 1972, she returned to Zile. The same year, she established her own drugstore and entered politics.

İleri was a member of the 19th parliament representing Tokat from the Social Democratic Populist Party (SHP) (SHP). She served as the Minister of State of the portfolio "Women and Family" in the 49th government of Süleyman Demirel from November 21, 1991 until February 22, 1992. She had to resign from her post in the cabinet following an interpellation about the payment of the death notice for her father from the ministerial budget.

References

Living people
1948 births
People from Zile
Turkish pharmacists
Social Democratic Populist Party (Turkey) politicians
Deputies of Tokat
Members of the 19th Parliament of Turkey
Women government ministers of Turkey
Government ministers of Turkey
Members of the 49th government of Turkey
Ministers of State of Turkey
Women pharmacists
20th-century Turkish women politicians